The Top of Europe is a high-altitude building located in the Swiss canton of Valais. It is connected to the underground Jungfraujoch railway station by a tunnel and to the Sphinx Observatory by an elevator. It has five levels.

The Top of Europe includes several restaurants and a permanent exhibition about the Jungfrau Railway and the Alps. It also includes Europe's highest-altitude post office. An older building includes a research station.

See also
List of buildings and structures in Switzerland above 3000 m

References

External links
Official website
History of the High Altitude Research Station Jungfraujoch

Buildings and structures in Valais